Doctor Dolittle and the Green Canary is a Doctor Dolittle book written by Hugh Lofting. Although much of the material had been printed originally in 1924 for the Herald Tribune Syndicate, Lofting planned to complete the story in the book form but never finished before he died. Lofting's wife's sister, dancer Olga Fricker, completed the book and was published posthumously in 1950. Everything except the first and last chapter are by Lofting.

Much of the book is repeated from the 1926 novel, Doctor Dolittle's Caravan. It tells the story of the Doctor's friend Pippinella the Green Canary, in slightly greater depth.

External links
 Doctor Dolittle and the Green Canary, available at Internet Archive (scanned books).

1950 British novels
1950 children's books
1950 fantasy novels
British children's novels
Novels published posthumously
Doctor Dolittle books
Books about birds
Fictional canaries
J. B. Lippincott & Co. books